Kateřina Sedláková (born 28 April 1990) is a Czech basketball player for Valosun KP Brno and the Czech national team, where she participated at the 2014 FIBA World Championship.

References

1990 births
Living people
Czech women's basketball players
Point guards
Shooting guards